Madusha Ushan may refer to:
 Madusha Ushann, Alborz
 Madusha Ushan, Isfahan